How to Boil a Frog is a 2010 Canadian eco-comedy documentary film written and directed by Jon Cooksey to show the consequences of too many people using up Earth resources and suggesting five ways that the filmmakers say people can save habitability on the Earth while improving their own lives at the same time.

Its title repeats the common misconception that one can boil a frog by heating it very gradually.

Cast
 Jon Cooksey as conductor / narrator 
 Debbie Cook as herself,  member 
 Julian Darley as himself, journalist 
 Yvo de Boer as himself - climate change czar 
 Michael Edwards as police officer 
 Gigi Gaskins as herself, Peak Oil Nashville 
 Ross Gelbspan as himself, author 
 James Inhofe as himself (archive footage)  
 George Monbiot as himself, author / journalist 
 Chris Mooney as himself, journalist 
 Naomi Oreskes as herself, science historian 
 Matthew Simmons as himself, energy expert 
 Chris Turner as himself, author 
 Rex Weyler as himself, ecologist / journalist 
 George W. Bush as himself (archive footage)

Release
The film premiered in September 2010 on Canadian television, followed by screenings at various film festivals in Canada and the U.S.

Recognition

Critical response

Awards & nominations
 2010, Won 'Best Environmental Film', Film Shift Movie Festival  
 2010, Won 'Best Concept Documentary', Los Angeles Movie Awards
 2010, Won 'Best Visual Effects - Documentary', Los Angeles Movie Awards
 2010, Won 'Best Documentary', Los Angeles Movie Awards
 2010, Won 'Best Green Film', Mammoth Film Festival
 2011, Won 'Grand Prix', Silafest
 2011, Won 'Special Mention Animation Film Award', Monaco International Film Festival
 2011, Won 'Best Editing', Silafest
 2011, Won 'Best Screenplay', Silafest
 2011, Won 'Environmental Conservation Award', CMS Vatavaran Environment and Wildlife Film Festival, Delhi, India
 2011, Won 'Best Film', Yellow Fever Film Festival, Belfast, Northern Ireland
 2011, Nominated 'Best Writing in a Documentary Program or Series', 28th Annual Gemini Awards
 2011, Finalist 'Best Writing - Documentary', Writers Guild of Canada Screenwriting Awards

References

External links
 
 

2010 television films
2010 films
Canadian documentary television films
Canadian independent films
Documentary films about environmental issues
2010 comedy films
English-language Canadian films
2010 documentary films
2010 independent films
2010s Canadian films